The papal inauguration of Pope Francis was held on 19 March 2013 in St. Peter's Square in the Vatican. Holy Mass was celebrated by Pope Francis before political and religious leaders from around the world. The crowd was estimated between 150,000 and 200,000. Official delegations from 132 states and various religious groups attended. It was the first papal inauguration attended by the Patriarch of Constantinople in over 1,000 years.

Ceremony 

About half an hour before the Mass, Francis toured the square in the popemobile to greet the crowds. He stopped and left the popemobile once to kiss a disabled man. Pope Francis wore a simple mitre, which he has had since he was bishop, as well as its matching chasuble. He used the pastoral staff that Benedict XVI used, but in contrast to Benedict XVI's grand liturgical sense, Pope Francis kept the songs and liturgical actions simple. According to Cardinal Timothy Dolan, Pope Francis's lack of singing during Mass is attributed to him having only one lung.

After the pope's arrival, the ceremony began with the new pope descending to the tomb of St. Peter in St. Peter's Basilica. The pope, along with the patriarchs and major-archbishops of the Eastern Catholic Churches prayed at the tomb. Afterwards, the pallium—a lamb's wool shawl—and the Ring of the Fisherman were taken by two deacons from the tomb where they had previously been laid and carried up to be borne in procession. Then the pope and the Eastern Catholic patriarchs and major-archbishops went up to the basilica main floor and proceeded along with the other cardinals, bishops and other clergy in procession to the square chanting the "Laudes Regiæ".

The cardinal protodeacon, Cardinal Jean-Louis Tauran, bestowed the pallium on the pope. The senior cardinal-priest present, Godfried Danneels, read the prayer for the new pope before the Ring of the Fisherman was presented. Angelo Sodano, Dean of the College of Cardinals, presented him with his Fisherman's Ring of gold-plated silver unlike his predecessors' which were gold. Six cardinals, two of each rank of cardinal, then professed their obedience to Pope Francis on behalf of the College of Cardinals. In previous ceremonies, all the cardinals did so.

According to a Vatican spokesperson between 150,000 and 200,000 people attended.

Homily 
Pope Francis delivered his homily in Italian. He focused on the Solemnity of Saint Joseph, the liturgical day on which the Mass was celebrated. He stated that everyone needs to care for the earth and for each other as Joseph cared for Jesus and Mary. He set forth a plan of his own actions: "The pope, too, when exercising power, must enter ever more fully into that service, which has its radiant culmination on the cross."

Official delegations 

Some 132 states and international organizations sent delegations to the inauguration. The delegations included 6 sovereign rulers, 31 heads of state, 3 princes, and 11 heads of government.

States

Taiwan's representation was opposed by China, which has asked the Vatican to end the diplomatic relations with the state.

Others

Religious figures

Christian churches

The Ecumenical Patriarch of Constantinople had not attended a papal inauguration since the Great Schism of 1054. Orthodox leaders said that the decision of Patriarch Bartholomew I of Constantinople to attend showed that he considers the relationship between the Orthodox and Catholic churches a priority. They also noted that Francis' "well-documented work for social justice and his insistence that globalization is detrimental to the poor" may have created a "renewed opportunity" for the two church communities to "work collectively on issues of mutual concern."

Other religions

Notes

References

External links
 
 Pope Francis inauguration: as it happened

Pope Francis
2013 in Italy
2013 in Christianity